Jawad Hameed (born 31 August 1976) is a Pakistani first-class cricketer who played for Rawalpindi cricket team.

References

External links
 

1976 births
Living people
Pakistani cricketers
Rawalpindi cricketers
Pakistan Telecommunication Company Limited cricketers
Zarai Taraqiati Bank Limited cricketers
Cricketers from Rawalpindi